Legambiente is an Italian environmentalist association with roots in the anti-nuclear movement that developed in Italy and throughout the Western world in the second half of the '70s. Founded in 1980 as part of the ARCI, it later became a stand-alone organisation. Originally known as Lega per l'ambiente (League for the Environment), it changed name during the IV National Congress held in Parma in 1992. The mission of the association is to make the environmental culture the centre of a new kind of development and diffused well-being. Important values for the association are the improvement of environmental quality, the fight against all forms of pollution, a wise use of natural resources, the construction of a more balanced relationship between human beings and the nature. It is considered the most widespread environmental organisation in Italy, as it is composed by a national headquarter in Rome, 20 regional branches, about 1000 local groups and more than 115,000 members.

Activity
Legambiente's activity is based upon the idea of scientific environmentalism, which means that every campaign or proposal for the protection of the environment is developed from a preliminar review of scientific data.

In more than 35 years of activity, Legambiente has organised many environmental monitoring and awareness raising campaigns and volunteering activities on air quality, sea pollution and marine litter. Fought against illegal building and denounced the illegal dumping of waste and the action of ecomafie, with an annual report on environmental crimes related to the activities of criminal organisations. The association promotes, among other things, the use of renewable energy, energy efficiency, green and circular economy, preservation of natural protected areas, fighting illegal waste management. It annually carries out an accurate analysis of the situation of environment in Italy with the "Ambiente Italia" report.  It was among the promoters of the 1987 and 2011 referendums against nuclear energy.

The association publishes the monthly newsmagazine La Nuova Ecologia (New Ecology).

Among its most famous activists are Ermete Realacci (chairman from 1987 to 2003 and still honorary chairman of Legambiente. He has been member of the Italian Parliament from 2001 to 2018.), Laura Conti (1921-1993,  medical doctor, historical figure of the Italian ecologism, involved in the studies about Seveso health effects in 1976. Member of the Parliament for the PCI from 1987 to 1992), Fabrizio Giovenale (1918-2006, urban planner, writer, ecologist. Founding member of Legambiente and editor for La Nuova Ecologia.) and Alexander Langer (1946-1995), founding member of the Green Party Verdi, promoted many meetings for peace end for the environment.

The Chernobyl disaster and the mobilization against nuclear power
On 26 April 1986, an accident at the Chernobyl nuclear power plant in Ukraine released a radioactive cloud across half of Europe. In Italy, the first reactions of the authorities tend to downplay the impact of the accident. The magazine La Nuova Ecologia and the Lega per l'Ambiente, in early May, show evidence during a press conference of the data about radiation levels detected in the country. In the following days, the authorities forbid the consumption of some foods such as milk and salad. On May 10, in Rome, a great popular event attended by more than 200,000 people marks the first step towards a referendum that the following year puts an end to the use of nuclear energy in Italy.

The uprise against nuclear power represents a turning point in the history of environmentalism in Italy: more than one million people sign to ask for the referendum, the Lega per l'ambiente and WWF double their members, and the general election of 1987 the Greens get nearly a million votes.

Legambiente was also one of the promoters of the referendum committee against nuclear power, the coalition "Vote Yes to stop the nuclear", consisting of more than 60 associations, which promoted the mobilization for the referendum on 12 and 13 June 2011. Referendum that confirmed, 25 years after Chernobyl, the opposition of the majority of the Italian citizens against nuclear energy.

Green Schooner
Also in 1986, for the first time the Goletta Verde (Green Schooner) made a voyage from Sanremo to Trieste along the 4,000 kilometers of the Italian coast to check the health of the sea. The campaign, organised together with the magazine L'Espresso (which publishes weekly data from surveys carried out), is the first study on marine pollution at a time when the control authorities were not able to provide an overview of state of the sea. In each location where the boat stops (in the first edition they are 45), press conferences are held to discuss the state of sea's health.

In the following years, partly as a result of the stimulus represented by the environmental campaign, public controls are gradually enhanced, so the Green Schooner campaign changes slowly, moving from one action to check up on the sea conditions (which also remains) to broader spectrum of initiatives: the promotion of activities to report illegal buildings, and illegal waste management on the beaches. Among these activities, the better known is the campaign to bring down two hotels that had been built illegally, the Fuenti Hotel in Vietri sul Mare and the 'Saracinesca' in Punta Perotti (Bari).

Ecomafia

The word ecomafia appeared for the first time in 1994 in the first report written by Legambiente with the help of Eurispes and Carabinieri as a result of the Naples waste management issue. It was then a neologism. A few years later, the italian dictionary Zingarelli have certified the usefulness of this term.

The collaboration with the Carabinieri was not granted for an environmental organisation in the mid 90s. The task was entrusted to Enrico Fontana, a journalist, a past in the newspaper Paese Sera and then at Espresso. With Stefano Ciafani, Nunzio Cirino, and Lorenzo Miracle, they started to collect and systematize information and data about environmental crimes. This led to the Report Ecomafia, a job in a few years has become a reference for those who work to suppress this phenomenon. The relationship grew to work with all law enforcement agencies and now Legambiente works with the National Anti-Mafia pool to fight ecomafie.

Mal'Aria

Mal'Aria (meaning bad air, a pun about the malaria disease) is one of the historic campaigns of the association. Every year, during the months of January and February are held initiatives to boost public transport at the expense of private transport, the main cause of poor air quality of the city, especially because of the notorious fine dust (PM 10). On the other hand, the occasional 'car free days' seem to do little to improve air quality. One of the most characteristic aspects of the initiative is the exposure of 'smog catching sheets' simple white sheets that are exposed in the open air (from windows, balconies etc.). Especially in "sensitive" areas, urban centers, industrial areas, schools. After a month, the blackening of the sheet is at the same time a very clear and low tech indicator to demonstrate the quality of the air we breathe.

People linked to the association
 Chicco Testa, first secretary and then president of the Association in the early 1980s. Later, he became a member of the PCI and of the PDS, he was president of Acea and Enel. After having supported the battle against nuclear energy in the 1980s, on the occasion of the 2011 referendum he instead openly supported the return to nuclear power, becoming president of Italian Nuclear Forum.
 Ermete Realacci, president from 1987 to 2003 and still honorary president of Legambiente. Elected in 2001 to the Italian Chamber of Deputies with The Daisy and the Democratic Party, he was president of the Environment Committee of the Chamber from 2006 to 2008.
 Laura Conti, (1921-1993), doctor, historical figure of Italian environmentalism, was among the first to be interested in the incident of Seveso of 1976. Member of the PCI from 1987 to 1992, she was also president of the scientific committee of the League for the Environment.
 Alexander Langer, (1946-1995), one of the founders of the Federation of the Greens party, and was the promoter of numerous initiatives for peace, coexistence, human rights, against genetic manipulation and for the defense of the environment.
 Massimo Serafini, one of the founders of the newspaper Il manifesto. Member of the PCI from 1983 to 1992, he was among the presenters of the main legislative proposals on environmental issues. Among the promoters of the 1987 anti-nuclear referendum, he is a member of the National Assembly of Legambiente's elected representatives.
 Roberto Della Seta, was national president from 2003 to 2007. Parliamentarian for the Democratic Party from 2008 to 2013.
 Francesco Ferrante, general manager from 1995 to 2007, elected Senator in 2006 with The Daisy, he was The Olive Tree's group leader in the Senate Environment Committee from 2006 to 2003 and then still a member of the Senate from 2008 to 2013 for the Democratic Party.
 Maurizio Sacconi, former Senator of The People of Freedom and New Centre-Right, former minister and undersecretary in the Berlusconi IV Cabinet and former socialist Deputy, he was president of the association between 1981 and 1984.
 Rossella Muroni, general director from 2007 to 2015 and then national president from 2015 to 2017; she is elected Deputy for Free and Equal in 2018.

See also
Nuclear power debate
Italian referendums, 1987
Nuclear power in Italy
Anti-nuclear movement

References

External links
Web bulletin

Environmental organisations based in Italy
Anti-nuclear organizations